Juan Chávez (Aguascalientes, July 4, 1831 – Camino de Arrona, February 15, 1869) was the Governor of the State of Aguascalientes, Mexico and its surroundings, also known by the nicknames of "Ídolo de las Beatas" or "Rojas de los Mochos", nicknames that were imposed by the press of the time. He was a partisan of the conservatives and supported the Second Mexican Empire during the French Intervention.

Juan Chávez is an individual around whom various legends and myths have developed that derive from his illicit activities, including that he left a hoard of buried treasure, although very little is really known about his life prior to becoming a thief and highway robber, and the little information with which it is counted from that previous time has been obtained directly from both marriage and death certificates.

References

Bibliography

External links 
 
 
 

Governors of Aguascalientes
1831 births
1869 deaths
Politicians from Aguascalientes
Highwaymen
History of Aguascalientes